The Cima di Biasca is a mountain of the Swiss Lepontine Alps, located southeast of Biasca in the canton of Ticino.

References

External links
 Cima di Biasca on Hikr

Mountains of the Alps
Mountains of Switzerland
Mountains of Ticino
Lepontine Alps